Fan Bai is a researcher and engineer, from General Motors Global R&D, Detroit, MI, who was named Fellow of the Institute of Electrical and Electronics Engineers (IEEE) in 2016 for contributions to vehicular networking and mobility modeling. Since the same year, he is also a fellow of the Vehicular Technology Society.

Education
Bai received a Ph.D. in electrical engineering from the University of Southern California in 2005

References

External links

20th-century births
Living people
USC Viterbi School of Engineering alumni
Fellow Members of the IEEE
21st-century American engineers
Year of birth missing (living people)
Place of birth missing (living people)
American electrical engineers